Abu Ja'far Muhammad ibn 'Ali ibn Babawayh al-Qummi (–991), commonly referred to as Ibn Babawayh or al-Shaykh al-Saduq was a Persian Shia Islamic scholar whose work, entitled Man La Yahduruhu al-Faqih, forms part of The Four Books of the Shia Hadith collection.

Life 
The patronymic, Ibn Babawayh indicates a Persian origin, as Babawayh is an Arabic form of the Persian name Babuyah. For some length of time, unknown, the family had been devout adherents of Shia Islam. Ibn Babawayh's father, Ali ibn Babawayh Qummi (d. 939 CE) was a leading figure among the Islamic scholars of Qom.

Birth
The exact date of Ibn Babawayh's birth is not known. Shia scholars consider his birth to be after the year 305 A.H. (probably 306 A.H.) Ibn Babawayh was educated by his father. He was taught by local scholars of Shia Islam. Qom was a centre of study of Shia traditions and it was this form of religious learning to which Ibn Babawayh adhered.

Middle Years
In 966 CE, Ibn Babawayh left Qom for Baghdad. He travelled widely, learning about the tradition of Islam. Ibn Babawayh later emphasized the importance of tradition over speculative theology. His works reflect this interest in traditions and nearly all of them take the form of compilations of traditions. However, Ibn Babawayh did write a creed of Shia Islam al-I'tiqadat. His pupil, the al-Shaykh al-Mufid, revised this creed in Tashih al-I'tiqad, critiquing several points.

Works
Ibn Babawayh was a prolific scholar. Muhammad ibn Al-Hasan al-Tusi (d. 1067 CE) numbered Ibn Babawayh's works at over 300 but counted only 43 in his immediate possession. al-Najashi (d. 1058 AD) listed 193 works but does not mention Ibn Babawayh's sentinel work, Man la yahduruhu al-faqih. Many of Ibn Babawayh's works are considered lost but some do survive. Some have been published and others survive in manuscript form.

Later years
During the last years of his life al Shaykh al-Saduq lived in Ray. He had been invited there by Rukn al-Dawla of the Buyid family. Although he was treated well, his teaching was then restricted by the Buyid family wazir (official), ibn 'Abbad. The attack appears to have been aimed at traditionalists in general as several Sunni traditionists suffered similar restrictions.

Death
Ibn Babawayh died in Ray in 381 A.H. He was probably more than 70 years of age. He is buried at Ebn-e Babooyeh in Persia (modern day Iran.

Man La Yahduruhu al-Faqih

Man La Yahduruhu al-Faqih (lit. For Him Who is Not in the Presence of a Jurisprudent or When No Theologian is Present) a component of the group of four major books about the traditions of Shi'ite Islam. Despite the fact that many of Ibn Babawayh's other works are extremely important, this book is probably the most famous of his extant writings. However, some authorities maintain that there were five major books of traditions that included another of Ibn Babawayh's works, Madinat al-'ilm. Al-Tusi mentions that the latter work was bigger than Man la yahduruhu al-faqih but may no longer exist. Madinat al-'ilm was likely concerned with al-din (the principles of religion) rather than furu, the practical regulations for carrying out the shari'a (Islamic law).

Purpose
Man la yahduruhu al-Faqih (lit. For Him Who is Not in the Presence of a Jurisprudent) is concerned with furu''' (Jurisprudence). The title has been neatly translated by Edward Granville Browne as "Every man his own lawyer". In his introduction to the book, Ibn Babawayh explains the circumstances of its composition and the reason for its title. When he was at Ilaq near Balkh, he met Sharif al-Din Abu 'Abd Allah. Ibn Babawayh was delighted with Sharif al-Din Abu 'Abd Allah's discourses with him and his gentleness, kindness, dignity and interest in religion. Sharif al-Din Abu 'Abd Allah showed Ibn Babawayh a book compiled by Muhammad ibn Zakariya al-Razi entitled Man la yahduruhu al-Tabib or "Every man his own doctor". Sharif al-Din Abu 'Abd Allah, then asked Ibn Babawayh to compile a similar work of reference on Fiqh (jurisprudence), al-halal wa al-haram (the permitted and prohibited), and al-shara-i' wa-'l-ahkam (revealed law and ordinary laws).Man la yahduruh al-faqih represents a synopsis of all the traditions that Ibn Babawayh had collected, while his prior works, for example, Kitab al-nikah (the book of marriage) and Kitab al-hajj (the book of pilgrimage) are each a treatise on different aspect of furu'. Further, Man la yahduruhu al-Faqih was intended as a reference for the ordinary man in that the Isnads are not recorded. The isnads are the chain of authorities through which the traditions were received from the Prophet or one of the Imams. In the science of traditions, this providence is all important. A scholar would expect the isnads to be present for examination.

Ibn Babawayh said he wrote the synopsis: "... because I found it appropriate to do so. I compiled the book without isnads (asanid) so that the chains (of authority) should not be too many (-and make the book too long-) and so that the book's advantages might be abundant. I did not have the usual intention of compilers (of books of traditions) to put forward everything which they (could) narrate but my intention was to put forward those things by which I gave legal opinions and which I judged to be correct.

Contents
Ibn Babawayh not only records the traditions but also gives interpretation. For instance, in a summary of the various traditions of the pilgrimage, he gives a long outline of all the rituals which should be performed by the faithful, with very few traditions interrupting his description. The book is not arranged in kutub (chapters) but in abwab (sections).

Sources
In Man la yahduruhu al-faqih, Babawayh discusses his sources. These include the works of Hariz ibn 'Abd Allah al-Sijistani and 'Ubaid Allah ibn 'Ali al-Halabi who were contemporaries of the Imam Ja'far al-Sadiq. They also included the works of Ali ibn Mahziyar; al-Husayn ibn Sa'id; and Ahmad ibn Muhammad ibn 'Isa (died 297 A.H.) who all heard the traditions of the Imams Ali Al-Ridha, Muhammad al-Jawad and al-Hadi. Other sources were the works of Muhammad ibn Yahya ibn 'Imran al-Ash'ari, Sa'd ibn 'Abd Allah (died about 300 A.H.) and Muhammad ibn al-Hasan (died 343 A.H.) Ibn Babawayh was taught by the latter. The sources also included the works of Muhammad b. Abi 'Umayr (died 218 A.H.), Ahmad ibn Abi 'Abd Allah al-Barqi (died in 274 or 280 A.H.) and the Risala which Ibn Babawayh's father had written to him. Ibn Babawayh also cites his own works.

CritiquesMan la yahduruhu al-faqih has been the subject of many critiques. These include commentaries by Zain al-'Abidin al-'Alawi al-'Amili (died 1060 A.H.) and Muhammad Taqi al-Majlisi al-Awwal (died 1070 A H ).

Other works
 Kamal al-din wa tamam al-ni'mah meaning "the perfection of the religion and the end of the blessings" is about Mahdi, the prophesied redeemer. It includes questions and answers about The Occultation, the event when the Mahdi appears.Omar I. Muslim View of Christianity. p89. "Abu'ja'far al-Suduq Ibn Babawayh al-Qummi, Ikmal al-Din."
 Ma'ani al-Akhbar explains the complexities of traditions and the Quranic verses.
 Oyoun Akhbar Al-Ridha, dedicated to Ibn-e Ebad, the minister of the Buyid family, includes some of the Imam Rida's traditions.
 Al-Khisal is about moral instruction and their scientific, historical and legal origins.
 Al-Amali is a collection of Ibn Babawayh's lectures.
 Ilal al-shara'i (meaning "the cause of situations") explores the philosophy of the Islamic ordinances.
 Eʿteqādātal-Emāmīya (meaning "creeds of Shia") presents a summary of the core tenets of the Shi'ite creed.
 Man la yahduruhu al-faqih, Ilal Al-Shara'i, Kamal al-din, Al-Khisal, Ma'ani al-Akhbar, Al-Tauheed and Sawab ul Amal wa Aqab ul Amal'' have been translated in Urdu language by Al-Kisa Publishers.

See also
 Ibn Babawayh Cemetery
 Shaykh Mufid
 Shaykh Murtaza
 Syed Razi

References

Further reading

External links
 The Four Books
 List of Shi'a books
 On the Commemoration of Shaikh Saduq Irib.ir.

People from Qom
Scholars under the Buyid dynasty
10th-century Persian-language writers
Shia hadith scholars